For Madmen Only is a rock album by the band Atomic Opera, released in 1994. The album was produced by ZZ Top video producer Sam Taylor. Taylor is known for his production and management work with the band King's X early in their career. The title is a reference to a sign above a hidden door, to the Magic Theatre in Steppenwolf by Hermann Hesse.

The CD was out-of-print for many years until 2014, when in celebration of the 20th anniversary of the album's release, Frank Hart released a remastered reissue of the album, including three bonus tracks.

Some Warner Bros. Records CDs (released under the Collision Arts label) were distributed as promotional copies and have gold lettering stating this stamped on the front cover.

The video for the song "Justice" was played approximately 20 times on MTV.

Track listing 
"Joyride" – 5:11
"Justice" – 3:33
"Achilles' Heel" – 5:54
"I Know Better" – 4:16
"All Fall Down" – 3:38
"War Drum" – 5:33
"Blackness" – 4:09
"December" – 5:07
"This Side of the Rainbow" - 3:37
"New Dreams" - 9:41

Performers 
 Frank Hart - Lead vocals, Guitar
 Jonathan Marshall - Guitar, Backing Vocals
 Mark Poindexter - Drums, Backing Vocals
 Jonas Velasco - Bass, Backing Vocals

Production 
Produced by Sam Taylor
Recorded by Sam Taylor
Engineered by Steve Ames
Mastered by George Marino at Sterling Sound Studios, New York, NY
Art direction by Allison Smythe, ARS Graphica, Houston, TX
Cover design, illustration and layout by Allison Smythe and Frank Hart
Photography by Frank Hart, Sam Taylor, Kate Warren
Illustrations by Frank Hart and Jonas Valesco
Drum technician: Robbie Parrish
Guitar technician: John Ziegler

References

External links
 For Madmen Only at Atomic Opera's official site

1994 albums
Giant Records (Warner) albums
Warner Records albums
Atomic Opera albums